Peter Godfrey-Smith (born 1965) is an Australian philosopher of science and writer, who is currently Professor of History and Philosophy of Science at the University of Sydney. He works primarily in philosophy of biology and philosophy of mind, and also has interests in general philosophy of science, pragmatism (especially the work of John Dewey), and some parts of metaphysics and epistemology. Godfrey-Smith was elected to the American Philosophical Society in 2022.

Education and career

Born in Australia in 1965, Godfrey-Smith received a Ph.D. in philosophy from the University of California, San Diego in 1991 under the supervision of Philip Kitcher. He previously taught at Harvard University, Stanford University, Australian National University, and the CUNY Graduate Center. Godfrey-Smith was the recipient of the Lakatos Award for his 2009 book, Darwinian Populations and Natural Selection which discusses the philosophical foundations of the theory of evolution.

He has criticized the arguments of intelligent design proponents.

Other Minds

In 2016, Godfrey-Smith published the book Other Minds: The Octopus, the Sea, and the Deep Origins of Consciousness. It explores the origin of sentience, consciousness and intelligence in the animal kingdom, specifically how it evolved in cephalopods compared to mammals and birds.

Selected publications

Books

References

Further reading

External links

1965 births
Critics of creationism
Harvard University faculty
Living people
Animal cognition writers
Philosophers of biology
Philosophers of science
Stanford University Department of Philosophy faculty
University of California, San Diego alumni
Lakatos Award winners
Academic staff of the Australian National University
Academic staff of the University of Sydney
Graduate Center, CUNY faculty
University of Sydney alumni
Philosophers of mind
Australian philosophers
Members of the American Philosophical Society